Gerardo Octavio Vargas Landeros (born 21 October 1962) is a Mexican businessman and politician. From 2006 to 2009 he served as Deputy of the LX Legislature of the Mexican Congress representing Sinaloa.

References 

1962 births
Living people
Politicians from Sinaloa
People from Los Mochis
21st-century Mexican politicians
Deputies of the LX Legislature of Mexico
Members of the Chamber of Deputies (Mexico) for Sinaloa